"6 Years of Boney M. Hits (Boney M. on 45)" is a greatest hits medley by Boney M., inspired by the success of the hit medleys by Stars on 45. Originally released on the B-side of the band's 1981 Christmas single "Little Drummer Boy", the single was flipped over in January 1982 with the medley as an A-side. While failing to chart in Germany, the medley reached #6 in the Spanish charts and was also an A-side release in France and Japan. The 12" version featured a faded version on the German pressing and an unfaded version on the French pressing, while the UK version (included on the B-side of their UK top 40 hit "We Kill the World") was extended with their Christmas chart-topper "Mary's Boy Child – Oh My Lord".

Track listing
+ indicates inclusion in 12" version only

"Let It All Be Music" (W. S. van Vugt) +
"Daddy Cool" (Farian, Reyam)
"Ma Baker" (Farian, Reyam, Jay)
"Belfast" (Drafi Deutscher, Menke, Billsbury)
"Gotta Go Home" (Farian, Huth, Huth, Jay)
"Love for Sale" (Porter) +
"Painter Man" (Pickett, Phillips) +
"Rasputin" (Farian, Reyam, Jay) +
"Brown Girl in the Ring" (Farian)
"Oceans of Fantasy" (Dietmar Kawohl, Didi Zill, Fred Jay) +
"Hooray! Hooray! It's a Holi-Holiday" (Farian, Jay)
"The Calendar Song (January, February, March)" (Farian)
"Dancing in the Streets" (Farian) +
"Bye Bye Bluebird" (Farian, Reyam, Jay) +
"Baby Do You Wanna Bump" (Zambi)
"Rivers of Babylon" (Farian, Reyam, Dowe, McNaughton)
"Sunny" (Bobby Hebb)
"Nightflight to Venus" (Farian, Kawohl, Jay) +
"Mary's Boy Child / Oh My Lord" (Jester Hairston, Lorin, Farian, Jay) - UK 12" version only

Releases
7" singles
"6 Years of Boney M. Hits" / "Little Drummer Boy" (Hansa 103 777-100, Germany)
"6 Years of Boney M. Hits" (1-sided record) (Hansa 103 953-000, Promo-only, Germany)
"6 Years of Boney M. Hits" / "Rivers of Babylon" (Ariola B-103 782, Spain)
"6 Years of Boney M. Hits" / "Sad Movies" (Atlantic P-1627, Japan)
"6 Years of Boney M. Hits" / "Bye Bye Bluebird" - 4:17 (France)
"Boney M. On 45" / "Strange" - 3:28 (Greece)

12" singles
 "We Kill the World (Don't Kill the World)" - 6:32 / "6 Years of Boney M. Hits" - 13:26 (Atlantic K11689T, UK)
"6 Years of Boney M. Hits" - 11:13 / "Little Drummer Boy" (Hansa 600 479-213, Germany)
"6 Years of Boney M. Hits" - 11:13 / "Rivers of Babylon" (Ariola B-600 539, Spain)
"6 Years of Boney M. Hits" (unfaded) - 11:15 / "Bye Bye Bluebird" (edit) - 4:17 (Carrere, 8.153, France)

Sources
Rate Your Music entry
Fantastic Boney M. 

1982 singles
Boney M. songs
Hansa Records singles